Symphony No. 27 in G major, K. 199/161b, is a symphony composed by Wolfgang Amadeus Mozart in April, 1773. The symphony is scored for 2 flutes, 2 horns, and strings.

This symphony is in three movements:

Allegro, 
Andantino grazioso, 
Presto,

References

External links

27
1773 compositions
Compositions in G major